Indie Campers is a motorhome rental company, operating in the European and American markets, with its own fleet of over 2000 vehicles distributed by more than 40 locations in Portugal, Spain, France, Italy, Germany, Netherlands, Croatia, United Kingdom, Belgium, Switzerland, Republic of Ireland, Sweden, Austria, Iceland, Denmark, Norway, and in the United States. In addition to its own fleet, Indie Campers has a Caravan Marketplace with more than 1600 vehicles from private hosts.

History 
Indie Campers was founded in Lisbon in 2013 by a Portuguese, Hugo Oliveira, who had the business idea after returning from a trip in Australia, in 2012. The business was launched alongside his Austrian friend, Stefan Koeppl with the guidance of the "Erasmus for Young Entrepreneurs", sponsored by the European Union. In 2014, to pursue a career as a venture capital investor, Stefan Koeppl sold his stake in Indie Campers, leaving Hugo Oliveria as the sole shareholder for the company.

In 2015, Indie Campers raised its first financing round (seed round), sponsored by Portugal Ventures at one hundred and forty thousand euros. The participation was reacquired in 2017 by the founder and CEO Hugo Oliveira, for seven hundred and fifty thousand euros, after the company's internationalization and growth objectives were achieved.

Between 2015 and 2017, Indie Campers grew from 3 to 80 employees, headquartered in Portugal with multiple operational locations across Europe, and multiplied its turnover four times each year. In January 2018, they announced hiring of 150 new employees in areas of operations, customer support, marketing and finance.

In 2020, Indie Campers was awarded a title as the fastest-growing Portuguese company in Europe between 2015 and 2018 according to FT1000 Europe's Fastest Growing Companies list published on the Financial Times. This ranking is based on the recorded increase rate of revenue growth, between 2015 and 2018. With the total growth of 2878% in the analyzed date range, and average annual growth of 210%. Indie Campers is ranked 37th place in the overall ranking.

2021 was a year of expansion for Indie Campers, the company extended its operations to the United States, thus becoming a transcontinental business and also launched a campervan Marketplace allowing caravan rental companies and private owners to rent their vehicles through the platform.

Business model 
Indie Campers allows its customers to rent campervans through an online check-in system.
This company presents a business model centered on the relocation of vans between their operational bases, according to the availability of each type of campervan and the demand for each location. This means that the company minimizes operating costs by offering its customers the possibility of booking one-way trips between the locations it serves. Subsequently, Indie Campers also started to create a market place for private motorhome owners and professionals to rent their vans through their platform  and resources.

The vans are, in general, a smaller size when compared to traditional motorhomes. And attic equipped with beds; storage areas; cooker; cooler chest; shower; cleaning kit; kitchen with sink; bathroom, among others. Several extra services may also be added such as Wi-Fi; bedding; bicycles; transfer to and from the airport; surfboards; outdoor tables and chairs, among others.

In October 2020, the company announced the launch of a new subscription model enabling renters to hire their campervans and motorhomes at a fixed price for a month or a year. The program is available in all their 15 locations and includes insurance, road side assistance, maintenance of the vans and a set number of miles per booking.

Products 
Indie Campers has multiple types of cars in its own fleet, from rooftop tent Jeeps to fixed beds RV´s, that accommodate from 2 to 5 people.

Locations 
Indie Campers is headquartered in downtown Lisbon and has operational depots in all countries where it is present. The locations served by the company are:

 Portugal
Faro
Lisbon
Porto
 Spain
Barcelona
Bilbao
Madrid
Malaga
Seville
 France
Paris - Charles de Gaulle
Bordeaux
Marseille
Lyon
Toulouse
Nantes
 Italy
Rome
Milan
Venice
Ólbia
Catania
 Croatia
Split
 Belgium
Brussels - Zaventem
 Switzerland
Geneva
Zurich
 Netherlands
Amsterdam
 Germany
Berlin
Cologne
Frankfurt
Hamburg
Munich
Stuttgart
Leipzig
Düsseldorf
Hannover
 United Kingdom
London
Liverpool
Edinburgh
 Republic Of Ireland
Dublin
 Iceland
Reykjavik
 Sweden
Stockholm
 Austria
Vienna
 Denmark
Copenhagen
 United States
San Francisco
Los Angeles
Las Vegas
Salt Lake City
Denver
Phoenix
Houston
Miami
Orlando

References

External links 
 

Car rental companies
Companies based in Lisbon
Portuguese companies established in 2013
Recreational vehicles